Spodnje Loke ( or , in older sources simply Loke) is a settlement east of Krašnja on the main road from Ljubljana to Celje in the eastern part of the Upper Carniola region of Slovenia. It is in the Municipality of Lukovica.

References

External links

Spodnje Loke on Geopedia

Populated places in the Municipality of Lukovica